This is a list of cricketers who have represented the New Zealand-based Wellington cricket team in either a first-class, List A or Twenty20 match.

Wellington's inaugural first-class match commenced on 28 November 1873, against Auckland cricket team at the Basin Reserve, Wellington, its first limited overs match on 20 February 1971, against Marylebone Cricket Club at the Basin Reserve, Wellington and its first 20Twenty match on 13 January 2006, against Northern Districts cricket team at the Basin Reserve, Wellington.

While some of the cricketers listed represented other teams the information included is for their career with Wellington.

Key
 First – Year of debut
 Last – Year of latest game
 Apps – Number of matches played
  – Player has represented New Zealand in a Test match, Limited Overs International or Twenty20 International match.
  - Player has represented a nation other than New Zealand in a Test match, Limited Overs International or Twenty20 International.

Cricketers

Notes

References

    
Wellington cricketers